Vulgichneumon is a genus of ichneumon wasps in the family Ichneumonidae. There are at least 30 described species in Vulgichneumon.

Species
These 30 species belong to the genus Vulgichneumon:

 Vulgichneumon bimaculatus (Schrank, 1776) c g
 Vulgichneumon brevicinctor (Say, 1825) c g b
 Vulgichneumon cagnatus (Fonscolombe, 1847) c g
 Vulgichneumon clypeatus (Berthoumieu, 1896) c g
 Vulgichneumon cordiger (Kriechbaumer, 1882) c g
 Vulgichneumon deceptor (Scopoli, 1763) c g
 Vulgichneumon diminutus (Matsumura, 1912) c g
 Vulgichneumon drydeni Heinrich, 1978 c g
 Vulgichneumon faunus (Gravenhorst, 1829) g
 Vulgichneumon heleiobatos (Porter, 1964) c g
 Vulgichneumon hirookaensis (Uchida, 1935) c g
 Vulgichneumon horstmanni Selfa & Anento, 1996 c g
 Vulgichneumon inconspicuus (Heinrich, 1938) c g
 Vulgichneumon leucaniae (Uchida, 1924) c g
 Vulgichneumon leucanioides (Iwata, 1958) c g
 Vulgichneumon lissolaba Townes, Momoi & Townes, 1965 c g
 Vulgichneumon mimicus (Cresson, 1867) c g
 Vulgichneumon normops Heinrich, 1967 c g
 Vulgichneumon phaeogenops Heinrich, 1972 c g
 Vulgichneumon saevus (Cresson, 1867) c g
 Vulgichneumon saturatorius (Linnaeus, 1758) c g
 Vulgichneumon siremps (Kokujev, 1909) c g
 Vulgichneumon stegemanni (Heinrich, 1934) c g
 Vulgichneumon suavis (Gravenhorst, 1820) c g
 Vulgichneumon suigensis (Uchida, 1927) c g
 Vulgichneumon taiwanensis (Uchida, 1927) c g
 Vulgichneumon takagii (Uchida, 1956) c g
 Vulgichneumon terminalis (Cresson, 1864) c
 Vulgichneumon trifarius (Berthoumieu, 1892) c g
 Vulgichneumon uchidai Momoi, 1970 c g

Data sources: i = ITIS, c = Catalogue of Life, g = GBIF, b = Bugguide.net

References

Further reading

External links

 

Ichneumoninae